Peter Adams may refer to:

Peter Adams (politician) (1936–2018), Canadian politician and former Liberal Member of Canada's House of Commons
Peter Adams (actor) (1938–1999), New Zealand-born actor on Australian television
Peter Adams (diplomat) (born 1944), former New Zealand ambassador to China
Peter Adams (British governor), former magistrate of Anguilla
Peter Adams, guitarist in Xero
Peter Adams (Australian footballer) (born 1964), Australian rules footballer
Peter Bradley Adams, folk-pop Americana singer-songwriter
Peter Seitz Adams (born 1950), American artist
Pete Adams (1951–2019), American football guard

See also
Peter Adam (disambiguation)
Brooks Adams (Peter Chardon Brooks Adams, 1848–1927), American historian and political scientist
Peter Caddick-Adams (born 1960), British military historian
Peter McAdams (1834–1926), Irish-American soldier